USS Rich may refer to the following ships of the United States Navy:

 , a Buckley-class destroyer escort launched in 1943 and sunk off Utah Beach in 1944
 , a Gearing-class destroyer launched in 1945 and struck in 1977

United States Navy ship names